The Kurumchi culture or the "Kurumchi blacksmiths" was the earliest Iron Age archaeological culture of Baikalia as proposed by Bernhard Petri. He also speculated that they were the progenitors of the Sakha people, a claim that didn't go unchallenged by his contemporaries. Petri assumed that the Kurumchi left Baikalia for the Middle Lena due to pressure from the ancestors of the Buryats. 

Alexey Okladnikov was a student of Petri who expanded scholarship on the Kurumchi. He connected them to the Kurykans, a people mentioned in Chinese historical sources. Kurumchi society was conceived as analogous to the Yenisei Kyrgyz, being composed of "simple people and the aristocrats."

Starting in the 1990s scholars have begun to challenge the claims made by Petri and Okladnikov. Bair Dashibalov concluded that Petri's findings come from a wide chronological period ranging from the 9th-14th centuries C.E.

Background

In 1912 the Russian Committee for the Study of Central and East Asia sent Bernhard Petri to Irkutsk. He was an employee of the Kunstkamera from 1910 until 1917. Petri was directed to document the social and material culture of the Buryats along with their religious beliefs. He was also instructed to seek out and discover ancient artifacts, so he initiated archaeological digs in the Murin River valley in the contemporary Ekhirit-Bulagatsky District of the Ust-Orda Buryat Okrug. During the late Russian Empire, itas located within the Kurumchi khoshun and was sometimes called the Kurumchi Valley.

Previously an educator named O. A. Monastyreva found a spindle whorl inscribed with Old Turkic script (described below) outside modern Narin-Kunta. Monastyreva assisted Petri in digging at this location, which was the primary focus of the year. Among the initial findings there were pottery shards and a small forge that Petri illustrated. In the following year he returned and expanded upon the excavation sites.

In 1916 Petri explored cave systems in Olkhon Island. Their entrances were barricaded with rocks in such way to only allow movement by crawling. They were perhaps seasonally inhabited only when dry during the winter months. Among the discoveries were flat stone slabs used to create graves arranged in a row. Their appearance was compared to Buryat yurts by Petri and later by Okladnikov to also be similar to Evenki dwellings called

Mikhail Ovchinnikov
Mikhail P. Ovchinnikov was a self-taught archaeologist who hypothesized the predecessors of the Sakha once inhabited Baikalia. He found evidence of iron and copper smithing along with caches of iron ore deposited in pits in the region. Some Sakha informants spoke of their ancestors being forced from Lake Baikal to the north and during this movement abandoned the Old Turkic alphabet. Ovchinnikov concluded that the ancestral Sakha migrated from Baikalia to the Lena during the time of Chinggis Khan.

In 1918 Petri became acquainted with Ovchinnikov at the Irkutsk city museum. They shared their archaeological findings and conclusions about the ancient history of Eastern Siberia. Petri reported that a frequent topic discussed was the origins of the Sakha. These conversations were "jokingly dubbed" the "Yakut problem" as the two scholars speculated on the Sakha ethnogenesis.

Kurumchi blacksmiths
In the 1920s Bernhard Petri published his interpretation of the artifacts found in the Murin River valley. He concluded that a hitherto unknown society produced the archeological remains. Iron items were discovered in their settlements which led to Petri calling them the "Kurumchi blacksmiths." A pupil of Petri's, Pavel Khoroshikh, stated the research performed by his teacher substantiated the southern origin of the Sakha people theory previously proposed by Vladimir I. Ogorodnikov, Mikhail P. Ovchinnikov, and Wacław Sieroszewski. He also noted the similarities between pottery discovered in the Murin River Valley and Olkhon Island. In autumn 1923 Petri led an expedition to Lake Khövsgöl and found ceramic remains he considered from the Kurumchi.

Territory
Petri saw Lake Baikal as the center of Kurumchi activity. He proposed that their northern cultural boundary was formed by the Lena headwaters, contemporary Balagansk on the Angara, and the river mouth of the Kichera; while the southern ran from modern Tunka to the Uda.

Iron smithing
According to Petri the Kurumchi were sophisticated blacksmiths. While their iron kettles were of Chinese origin, they were capable of repairing cracks with external patches. Kurumchi cliff drawings include figures possibly adorned in chainmail. Okladnikov detailed the Kurumchi iron-smithing techniques:"The furnace had the appearance of a large thick-walled vessel with a round bottom. In the pot there were two openings for nozzles, and it also contained ore and charcoal in layers. During smelter, air was forced into the vessel through the nozzle with bellows attached, and from above coal and softened [preheated] ore were gradually added. In the process of smelting, the iron settled, and a large iron ingot was formed, its lower part rounded and the upper surface flat."

Old Turkic writing

Two coal spindle whorls with a diameter of 3.5–6 cm inscribed with Old Turkic script were discovered in Baikalia. Petri studied the items, considering them to be Kurumchi products, and published an article about them in 1922.

An assistant and student of Petri, Gavriil Ksenofontov, characterized the findings as random discoveries found by non-archaeologists. As of 2019 they are reportedly lost and only photographs remain.

Narin-Kunta spindlewhorl

The first spindlewhorl was found outside the village of Narin-Kunta. It was discovered by an educator, O. A. Monastyreva, in their garden bed. This location became the principal dig for the Kurumchi culture during the 1910s. Donner and Räsänen presented a translation which was subsequently accepted by most researchers.

Shokhtoy spindlewhorl

The second spindlewhorl was discovered by farmers plowing a field near Shokhtoy. As it was found by happen-stance outside of an orderly archaeological dig Ksenofontov didn't consider the Kurumchi as the probable creators of the item. Donner and Räsänen were only able to distinguish some of the eroded characters. They offered "the fifth of the snowy month" and "the fifth month of the arqar year" as partial translations. Later Ksenofontov, Malov, Orkun, and Bazin offered their own interpretations of the partial text. In 2019 Tishin made a comprehensive translation.

Husbandry

Despite the limited pastures of Baikalia, Petri conceived that the Kurumchi were pastoralists. Cattle and horse bone fragments have been recovered and both were common subjects in cliff artwork attributed to them. Equestrian herds were speculated to originate from the Yenisei steppe and not the Mongolian Plateau. The appearance of Bactrian camels in supposed Kurumchi artwork made Okladnikov speculate about possible connections to the steppe cultures of Inner Asia.

Agriculture
According to Petri, the Kurumchi created fortified places of habitation in bountiful meadows and pastures or strategic positions overlooking valleys. Their settlements were inhabited either permanently or seasonally. 
Garden beds placed outside ancient stockades in the Angara watershed nearby Kulakova were claimed by Okladnikov to be Kurumchi constructions, who further considered them the first society practice agriculture in Baikalia.

Irrigation was considered to have been practiced to bolster the productivity of certain pastures. One surviving series of ancient ditches is 4.6 km outside Ust-Ordynsky starting near Ulan-Zola-Tologoy. Two 5 km long irrigation canals were placed 100-150m apart and dug up to 1 meter deep. Secondary lines were made off of the main lines to water additional fields. From the waterfalls of the Idyga the channels approached the right bank of the Kuda. A fortified position was found near the fields apparently created to block access to them.

Hunting

Game animals likely were an important food source for the Kurumchi. The most commonly found animal remains in supposed Kurumchi settlements were elk and roe deer while sites on Olkhon Island have sheep bones present. On the Upper Lena outside Kachug are depictions of goats and elk being hunted. Birds appear highly stylized and were likely inspired by waterfowl like geese and swans. Artwork made about hunting includes figures utilizing lassos and nets. While both were commonly employed by steppe cultures Okladnikov claimed neither was used in Baikalia before the Kurumchi.

Protigenitors of the Sakha

Formulation
Petri proposed that the Kurumchi were the ancestors of the Sakha people. This was based on three points:  

 Unlike the modern Tungustic and Buryat inhabitants of Western Baikalia, the Kurumchi "made excellent pots with a flat bottom and decorated them with patterns." The Sakha were praised as "great masters" of firing pots.
 Two spindle whorls were found with Old Turkic inscriptions in Western Baikalia.
He found additional commonalities between the Kurumchi and Sakha in their equestrian equipment like stirrups and bridles, along with their arrows, knives, and humpback scythes.

Petri concluded the following:

In addition, all the data suggests that the culture of the "Kurumchi blacksmiths" is very similar to the culture of the Yakuts. This gives us the right to make a cautious assumption that the unknown people "Kurumchi blacksmiths" are none other than the ancestors of the Yakuts. In making such an assumption, we must not forget that it is far from being proven, and that all our data, unfortunately, are only shaky indications of the possibility of our assumption.

Early criticism

In 1926 archivist and historian Efim D. Strelov wrote a critique of Petri's conclusions. He noted the Sakha lacked spindle whorls and weaving skills entirely. More definitive proof such as specific burial traditions was seen as necessary to establish the existence of the Kurumchi. Petri had compared the Kurumchi and Sakha using eleven analogies to which Strelov made his own counter-arguments. Strelov concluded that the Kurumchi culture was not related to the Sakha.

Another rebuttal came from Vasily I. Podgorbunsky who was a once a student of Petri. In 1928 he claimed the Sakha and Kurumchi were entirely unrelated and found their ceramics dissimilar. Podgorbunsky did however consider the Sakha descendants from certain Turkic peoples. This was based upon Iron Age pottery fragments found in 1917 during archaeological work performed in the Transbaikal Oblast and Irkutsk Governorate. The Sakha style pottery was claimed to have existed across Baikalia, Transbaikalia, the Mongolian Steppe, and the Yenisey watershed.

Alexey Okladnikov
Okladnikov defended the hypothesis that the Kurumchi were the Sakha progenitors. The early 11th century C.E. was speculated to be when Mongolic peoples migrated to Lake Baikal. The displaced Kurumchi were forced to travel the Lena, eventually reaching the modern  He further found similarities between Kurumchi and Sakha pottery traditions.

Modern consensus
In the 1990s Bair Dashibalov began a reexamination of the Kurumchi findings of Petri by using comparative analysis of other Siberian archaeological cultures. The Lake Khövsgöl pottery fragments were assessed as too incomplete to demonstrate Kurumchi origin. According to Petri the assorted Murin river valley artifacts were created by the Kurumchi no later than the 12th century C.E. Kurumchi stirrups are similar to generalized Eurasian-produced ones from the end of the 1st millennium C.E. In particular older stirrups are analogous to 8th-9th centuries C.E. Saltovo-Mayaki culture stirrups, while other stirrups are comparable to those utilized by the Mongolian Empire during the 13th-14th centuries C.E. Certain Kurumchi arrowheads are stylistically similar to findings from the 9th-10th century C.E. Yenisei Kirghiz, while others resemble ones produced by the Askizsky and Jurchens during the 11th-12th centuries C.E. Dashibalov concluded that the Murin river valley artifacts come from a wide chronological that ranges from the 9th-14th centuries C.E. This analysis have subsequently been accepted by some scholars.

According to Vladimir Tishin the two spindle whorls with Old Turkic inscriptions were produced locally between the mid-9th to 12th centuries C.E. However their discovery outside of archaeological digs by non-professionals and poor documentation by Petri made their specific cultural origins impossible to categorize.

Notes

References

Bibliography

Books

Articles
 
 
 
 
 
 
 
 
 
 
 
 
 
 
 
 
 

Archaeological cultures of Northern Asia
Early medieval archaeological cultures of Asia
Archaeological cultures of Siberia
Archaeological cultures in Russia
Turkic archeological cultures
History of Siberia
Russian